The Vita-Salute San Raffaele University ( Also known as UniSR) is a private university in Milan, Italy. It was founded in 1996 and is organized in three departments; Medicine, Philosophy and Psychology.

History and profile
The Vita-Salute San Raffaele University was first established in 1996 with the Department of Psychology stemming from the Department of Cognitive Science founded by Massimo Piattelli-Palmarini with Andrea Moro in 1993. The program follows the general-cognitive and the experimental-clinical lines of thought.

The San Raffaele College and University was fundamentally born as the offspring of an internationally renowned research hospital structure, where students attend basic research laboratories in many research fields, including neurology, neurosurgery, diabetology, molecular biology, AIDS studies among others. It has expanded since then to include research fields in Cognitive Science and Philosophy. Among the issues that are being studied in this university, beside clinical issues, are: philosophy of science, perception, biolinguistics, generative grammar and vision. San Raffaele University is a private university but all the professors teaching there do have the same status as public university professors and must have undergone a national selection as all other university professors in the country, such as the case of the Università Cattolica or the Bocconi University in Milan.

The Faculty of Medicine and Surgery proposes courses in Medicine and Surgery and in Biotechnology, both with strong scientific connotations, where the students go on ward rounds from their very first year. Moreover, the University Courses in Nursing and in Physiotherapy offer advanced teaching together with intense practical clinical training. In addition to these courses the Vita-Salute San Raffaele University also houses a number of Medical Training Programmes.

From 1999 a new Department has been created: the Department of Philosophy.

A new medical course was commenced alongside the Italian medical course in 2010. The International MD Program at Vita-Salute San Raffaele University has been designed to foster a new kind of doctor. This doctor will possess the necessary human, cultural, and professional values to provide healthcare and share ideas in today’s globalized world. The course is entirely in English and offers an innovative curriculum. Half of the seats are reserved for EU citizens while the other half for Non-EU citizens, making it truly international.

On July 18, 2011, the Italian national newspaper Il Sole 24 Ore published a general ranking of Italian universities. Vita-Salute San Raffaele University was awarded the top placement among Italian private universities.

The University has two student residences on campus; Cascina Melghera and Cassinella.

Departments

Medicine
Advanced Degree Course of Medicine and Surgery (in Italian)
International MD Program (in English)
Degree Course in Nursing
Degree Course in Physiotherapy
Degree Course in Dental Care
Degree Course in Biotechnology 
Advanced Degree Course of Medical, Molecular and Cellular Biotechnology

Psychology
Degree Course in Psychological Sciences
Advanced Degree Course of Clinical Psychology
Advanced Interdepartmental Degree Course in Cognitive Neuroscience (including dept. of Medical Studies and Philosophy)
Degree Course of Sciences of Communication

Philosophy
Degree Course in Philosophy
Advanced Degree Course in Philosophy
PhD Program in Philosophy and Cognitive Sciences

See also
San Raffaele Hospital
List of Italian universities

External links
 Vita-Salute San Raffaele University Website
 Vita-Salute San Raffaele University Website San Raffaele International MD Program

Educational institutions established in 1996
Universities in Milan
1996 establishments in Italy